Yinjiang Tujia and Miao Autonomous County also known in Tujia language as "Yinv jiangr Bif Ziv Kar hev Bef Kar zouf xengv xianr" is a county in the northeast of Guizhou province, China. It is under the administration of the prefecture-level city of Tongren.

Climate

References

County-level divisions of Guizhou
Tujia autonomous counties
Miao autonomous counties